Channahon Township is located in Will County, Illinois. As of the 2010 census, its population was 10,322 and it contained 3,486 housing units.

Geography

Demographics

References

External links
City-data.com
Will County Official Site
Illinois State Archives

Townships in Will County, Illinois
Townships in Illinois
1849 establishments in Illinois